This is a list of mayors, reeves and clerks of the City of Pickering, Ontario, Canada.

Town clerks (1811-1849) 
During the early days of Pickering Township the Town Clerk was the town officer with the most authority.

Note
Hector Beaton was appointed as collector in 1836 and by 1849 he was filling three roles (assessor, collector and clerk).  He remained in the role of Town Clerk until 1883, at which point his son Donald R. Beaton filled the roll until 1944.

Reeves (1850-1873)
Following the Municipal Corporations Act of 1849, Reeves became part of the Pickering leadership.  The first meeting of Pickering Council following the Act was held on January 21, 1850, at Thompson's Inn, located south of Brougham.

Note
T.P. White served as Ontario County Warden in 1861.

Mayors (1974-present)

Note
 George Ashe resigned and was elected to the Ontario Legislature. John Anderson was appointed Mayor following George Ashe's resignation

References

People from Pickering, Ontario
Municipal government of the Regional Municipality of Durham
Pickering